Vacchelli is an Italian surname. Notable people with the surname include:

 Gian Carlo Vacchelli (1981 – 2020), Peruvian sports commentator and Fujimorist politician 
 Piergiuseppe Vacchelli (born 1937), Adjunct Secretary Emeritus of the Congregation for the Evangelization of Peoples and President of the Pontifical Missionary Societies

See also 

 Bacchelli

Italian-language surnames